Tālis Linkaits (born 18 August 1970) is a Latvian politician. As of 23 January 2019, he serves as Minister for Transport in the cabinet of Prime Minister Arturs Krišjānis Kariņš. He represents The Conservatives.

References 

Living people
1970 births
20th-century Latvian politicians
New Conservative Party (Latvia) politicians